Eagledale Park is a  park located in the neighborhood of Eagledale on Bainbridge Island in the state of Washington, U.S..  Like several other parks on Bainbridge Island, Eagledale Park comprises land that was once a military installation.  Today the park features tennis courts, an off-leash dog park, a picnic shelter, a children's play area, a sand volleyball court and a pottery studio.

In the 1950s the site was used as part of the Project Nike anti-aircraft missile system. 

The park occupies some of the highest ground on Bainbridge Island. On a clear day, Mount Rainier may be seen from the park. 

The park is located on Bainbridge Island at 5055 Rose Avenue N.E.

References

Bainbridge Island, Washington
Dog parks in the United States
Parks in Kitsap County, Washington